Anarsia longipalpella is a moth of the  family Gelechiidae. It was described by Rebel in 1907. It is found in Yemen (Socotra).

References

longipalpella
Moths described in 1907
Endemic fauna of Socotra
Moths of Asia